Palmetto Bay is a suburban incorporated village in Miami-Dade County, Florida, United States. The population was 24,439 as of the 2020 US census.

Palmetto Bay includes three neighborhoods that were former census-designated places, Cutler, Rockdale and East Perrine.

History

In August 1992, Palmetto Bay and the surrounding South Miami-Dade area were severely damaged by Hurricane Andrew. Many of the homes and businesses in Palmetto Bay were destroyed. In the subsequent years, the area was slowly rebuilt. Although many areas of Miami were heavily affected by Hurricane Andrew, Palmetto Bay was one of the worst affected and remains a reminder of the hurricane's extensive disaster in the city today.

The village incorporated on September 10, 2002, taking the territory formerly held by the Cutler, Rockdale and East Perrine census-designated places. The founding council consisted of Mayor Eugene Flinn, Jr., Vice Mayor, Linda Robinson, and council members, John Breder, Edward Feller, and Paul Neidhart.

Geography
Palmetto Bay is located just west of Biscayne Bay . U.S. Route 1 (Dixie Highway) forms the western border of the village. Palmetto Bay is bordered to the northeast by Coral Gables, to the north by Pinecrest, to the northwest by Kendall, to the west by Palmetto Estates, to the southwest by West Perrine, and to the south by Cutler Bay.

Demographics

2020 census

As of the 2020 United States census, there were 24,439 people, 7,459 households, and 6,307 families residing in the village.

2010 census

As of 2010, there were 8,372 households, out of which 5.4% were vacant. Between 2009 and 2013, the average median income for a household in the village was $105,122. Also, between 2009 and 2013, the per capita income for the village was $39,271.

Economy
At one point the Burger King headquarters were located in what was the Cutler census-designated place, in a campus described by Elaine Walker of the Miami Herald as "sprawling" and "virtually hidden away." Burger King moved to its current headquarters in unincorporated Miami-Dade County in July and August 2002. The former Burger King headquarters as of 2007 houses rental offices for several companies.

Education
Palmetto Bay is served by the Miami-Dade County Public Schools.

Howard Drive Elementary, Perrine Elementary, and Coral Reef Elementary School, in Palmetto Bay, serve separate sections of the city.

The city is zoned to:
 Southwood Middle School
 Palmetto Middle School (Pinecrest)
 Miami Palmetto Senior High School (Pinecrest)

Palmetto Bay private schools:
Christ Fellowship Academy
Alexander Montessori School
Westminster Christian School
Palmer Trinity School
Perrine Seventh-Day Adventist School

Miami-Dade Public Library System and the Village opened the Palmetto Bay Branch Library in 2009.

Media
Palmetto Bay is served by the Miami market for local radio and television. The Village has its own newspaper, The Palmetto Bay News, which is published bi-weekly and is part of Miami Community Newspapers. Additionally, The Miami Herald covers the Village in its South Dade edition of its "Neighbors" supplement.

Prior to 2012, the Village streamed its council meetings exclusively online. In early 2012, the Village expanded its video services to a government access TV network, WBAY, which offers a variety of local programming in addition to coverage of council meetings.

Notable people

Jillian Ellis, head coach of the United States women's national soccer team; winner of 2015 and 2019 FIFA World Cup
Iggy Pop, singer, songwriter, musician, lyricist, record producer, actor
Sean Taylor, was an American Football Free Safety for the Washington Redskins, and a 2x Pro Bowler, before his death on November 27th, 2007.

Notable sites
 The Charles Deering Estate is situated on Old Cutler Road in Palmetto Bay. It served as the home of Charles Deering until 1927, when he died at the estate. Currently, the estate hosts cultural arts events and can be rented out for private events, such as weddings.
 Thalatta Estate Park, a Mediterranean Revival style house built in 1926 and preserved as a park by the Village.

References

External links

Palmetto Bay Demographics - accessed November 3, 2007
Elementary schools: Coral Reef, Howard Drive, Perrine

Villages in Miami-Dade County, Florida
Villages in Florida
Populated places on the Intracoastal Waterway in Florida
2002 establishments in Florida
Populated places established in 2002